Philip Burton (26 July 1908 – 3 January 1995) was an Irish Fine Gael politician, farmer and auctioneer.

He was born in the townland of Curragh, Kanturk, County Cork, the son of Francis Burton, a farmer, and Anne Guiney. His maternal uncles were All-for-Ireland League MPs for North Cork Patrick Guiney and John Guiney.

He was elected to Dáil Éireann as a Fine Gael Teachta Dála (TD) for the Cork North-East constituency at the 1961 general election. He was re-elected at the 1965 and 1969 general elections (for Cork Mid from 1969), but lost his seat at the 1973 general election. He was subsequently elected to the 13th Seanad on the Administrative Panel. He retired from politics in 1977.

References

1908 births
1995 deaths
Fine Gael TDs
Members of the 17th Dáil
Members of the 18th Dáil
Members of the 19th Dáil
Members of the 13th Seanad
Politicians from County Cork
Irish farmers
Fine Gael senators